Game On Expo is a multimedia gaming convention that began in August 2015, and is the largest gaming and anime convention in Arizona. It covers all types of gaming from video games and arcades to board games and tabletop games. The expo boasts a large vendor hall, video game lounge area, free-play arcades, tournaments (both video and card games), cosplay contests, panels, and a variety of special guests.

References

External links 

Conventions in Arizona
Gaming conventions
2015 establishments in Arizona
Recurring events established in 2015
Events in Phoenix, Arizona